A flooring clamp is a clamp(or cramp) for holding tongue and groove flooring in place while laying.

Use
A flooring clamp is used for holding tongue and groove flooring while individual boards are being face nailed. Up to 8 to 10 boards may be clamped at a time.  A minimum of two are required; more is the norm. Spaced say every 4th or 5th joist.  The clamp is placed over a joist (range 35 mm to 65 mm thick), then its ratchet action handle is used to apply horizontal pressure on a sacrificial bearing board (100  mm x 50 mm) to hold the flooring boards true and in place for fastening.

See also
 Clamp (tool)
 Flooring

External links
Laying a Timber Floor
Professional Floor Installation

Clamps (tool)
Floors
Woodworking hand tools